Typhoon Dan, known in the Philippines as Typhoon Pepang, was a tropical cyclone that affected multiple areas in the Western Pacific Ocean. As the twenty-third tropical storm and the fifth typhoon of the 1999 Pacific typhoon season, it originated from a tropical depression in the Philippine Sea. The depression strengthened to a tropical storm two days later, attaining the name Dan.

Heavy rainfall and major flooding hit the Philippines, China, and Taiwan. 44 people died, and around $432.8 million (2022 USD) in damage was caused due to Dan.

Meteorological history 

The PAGASA designated the system Pepang. The system intensified as it moved west-northwest, making the system gain the name Dan on October 3. Dan would strengthen to a typhoon status the next day. Typhoon Dan reached its peak with winds of  early on October 5 and hit northern Luzon at that strength. The typhoon weakened as it entered the South China Sea, but re-intensified as it turned towards the north. Typhoon Dan made its second landfall near Xiamen, China on October 9 and weakened overland. Dan turned to the northeast and weakened to a tropical depression before it moved over the Yellow Sea late on October 10, later getting absorbed by a frontal system over the Yellow Sea early the next day.

Preparations and impact

China 
Thirty-four died and 1,400 people were injured as a result of the storm in Fujian. 1,500 houses were destroyed and $240 million of damage occurred in the province. Dan was the worst typhoon to hit Xiamen in 46 years, killing five and injuring over 100 in the city. In Zhangzhou, collapsing buildings resulted in seven deaths. Eighteen people were killed nearby in Quanzhou. Dan caused more damage on top of an earthquake that had occurred not long before Dan's landfall.

Philippines 
Hundreds of houses were damaged in Northern Luzon. There was more than $2 million of damage to agriculture in the Philippines.

Taiwan 
Southern Taiwan was still recovering from the Jiji earthquake of the previous month, and Dan delayed the recovery efforts. The typhoon burst a dike in Kaohsiung and another in Tainan, that had been damaged by the earthquake. Dan knocked down a large number of trees on Kinmen, which led to the disruption of 70% of the island's power supply. Several fishing boats were sunk and houses were damaged on Penghu. Over 850 areas of Taiwan were put under a landslide warning.

See also 

 1999 Pacific typhoon season
 Typhoon Nora (1973) – the strongest category 5 typhoon by barometric pressure, which affected similar areas.
 Typhoon Thelma (1977) – took a similar track.
 Typhoon Clara (1981) – a category 4 typhoon that affected the Philippines, China, South Korea, and Japan.
 Typhoon Hal (1985) – affected Northern Luzon as a category 3 typhoon and made landfall in China.
 Typhoon Warren (1988) – took a nearly identical track.
 Typhoon Percy (1990) – a category 4 typhoon affected similar areas.
 Typhoon Nuri (2008) – a category 3 typhoon that took a similar track.
 Typhoon Megi (2010) – a category 5 typhoon that took a comparable track.
 Typhoon Haima (2016) – a very intense typhoon that made landfall in Luzon and China.

References